Abdul Hakim Sialkoti (1560–1657) (ملا عبدالحکیم سیالکوٹی) was a Muslim scholar. He was born in Sialkot during the era of Mughal Emperor Akbar. He was the son of Sheikh Shams-ud-Din. He was a scholar of Qur'an and a leading philosopher of Islam in his time. He was also known as "Fazil Sialkoti" and "Fazil Lahori". He wrote many books on logic and philosophy. His books are taught at international level Islamic universities. The Mughal emperor Shah Jahan had him weighed in gold once and in silver twice. He died on 24th Safar. His tomb is in Sialkot on the back of Abdul Hakim Park close to a Power House. He is also well known for introducing the Persian philosopher Mulla Sadra in India. He gave the title of Mujaddid Alif Thani to one of the prominent scholars of Islam, Ahmad Sihindi.

Birth
Mullah Abdul Hakim Sialkoti was born in Sialkot Punjab in 968 AH / 1560 in the reign of Emperor Akber.

Education
He was the student of a renowned religious scholar of his time, Abdul Hakim Sialkoti or called as Molana Kamaluddin Kashmiri (1017 AH/ 1608). Molana was the brother of another renowned scholar of his time Molana Jamlauddin and he was the disciple of Baba Fatah Allah Haqani who was very close to Khawajah Abdushaheed Naqshbandi. He was a great scholar remembered in the history as Allama Mashriqayn, Scholar of East and Moallem e saqalain, master of universe. He had two universities one in Lahore and one in Sialkot and people from far away came to learn under his brilliance.

Classmates
Mullah had two very famous class fellows, Mujaddid Al-fe Thani, who is one of the most prestigious spiritual personality from Subcontinent and Nawab Saadullah Khan, who was the president of the court of Emperor Shah Jahan.
Ahmad Sirhindi and Mullah were both classmates but after the completion of their studies they remained separated till 1022 AH/ 1613 but later in that year, one of Mullah's students remained absent for few days from the class. Mullah got concerned and he sent word for him. After that, the student came back with few pages in his hands on Mullah's curiosity, he told that he read these pages and caught his attention that he got so distracted from his studies. When Mullah read the pages, he was also surprised. In the end, he figured out that these pages were written by Ahmad sirhandi himself. After that one night in Mullah's dream, he saw Ahmad Sirhindi who was reciting some verses and interpreting the meanings of those to Mullah, when Mullah woke up he wrote a letter to Ahmad and mentioned the dream about him too, it is written in books that between 1023 AH/ 1614 to 1024 AH/ 1615, mullah went to Sirhand to meet Ahmad and Mullah accepted his discipleship. Ahmad too respected him a lot and even the title Mujaddid Alif Thani was given by Mullah himself while his true name is Sheikh Ahmed Sirhandi and also the Mujaddid gave Mullah a title of Aftab e Punjab ( A sun in the scholars of Punjab)

Career and Achievements
Mullah in the reign of Emperor Akbar was officially appointed professor at the University in Lahore that was constructed by Akber himself. In the reign of emperor Jahangir he was greatly honoured and was given a huge land in acknowledging his services also in the early days of Emperor Shah Jahan, he was the principal of  Agra University. It was reported that he was given six thousand coins equivalent to the weight of his own as a gift.

Students
He had only two notable students out of thousands in his lifetime: Mullah Abdur Raheem, justice of Murad Abad, and Mir Syed Ismail Baig.

Meeting with Sufi Poet Saint Shah Hussain
It is written by Prince Dara Shikoh in his book Hasanat ul Arifin (1064 AH/ 1653) that Mullah Abdul Hakim Sialkoti visited to the most famous Sufi master of his time, Shah Hussain (945 AH/ 1538-1008 AH/ 1599), who is one of the most celebrated Sufi poet of Punjabi language and is the father of the famous genre of punjabi poetry named as Kafi and asked him to take him as one of his disciples, but Shah Hussain refused to say that you are a Mullah religious man and is not fit for my discipleship.
Mullah witnessed two spiritual miracles of Shah Hussain, which he described as a man came to shah complaining about a woman he loved, but she was not responsive, so he was told to find a place of seclusion and to recall her name for few days, after which he came and said that the woman herself came to him and answered his love calls.
Another place a man came to the shah and told him that he has a dream, but it does not seem to come true. Shah Hussain handed over him a cow and asked him to urine over her. Lo and behold, his dream came true.

Titles
Mullah was given several titles in his lifetime as Aftab e Punjab, Fazil Lahori, Fazil Sialkoti, Malik ul Ulama and Allama e Zaman.

Death
He died in 1068 AH/ 1657 and was buried in Sialkot Punjab.

See also 
 Sialkot
 Shah Jahan
 List of Hanafis
 List of Sufis
 List of Muslim theologians
 List of Ash'aris and Maturidis

Notes

Hanafis
Maturidis
16th-century Muslim theologians
Islamic scholars
Indian logicians
Indian rationalists
Sunni Sufis
Sunni imams
Sunni Muslim scholars of Islam
Quranic exegesis scholars
People from Sialkot
People of Punjabi descent
17th-century Muslim scholars of Islam
1561 births
1656 deaths
1659 deaths
17th-century Muslim theologians
Academics from Lahore